Renato dos Santos (born 30 January 1987) is a Brazilian footballer who plays for Itabaiana.

Biography
In February 2007, he signed a 2-year contract with Corinthians Paulista. In June 2007 he was loaned to Juventus-SP for Campeonato Brasileiro Série C 2007, but the team exited in the first stage in August.

In December 2007 he was loaned to Grêmio Barueri for the whole 2008 year. He played the first 2 matches of Campeonato Brasileiro Série B 2008 but then dropped from the squad.

In August 2008 he was loaned to Boavista F.C. of Portuguese Liga de Honra, along with teammate Michel and Fuska. In May 2009, he was loaned to Marília for 2009 Campeonato Brasileiro Série C. After Marília exited the Série C ion the first stage, in August 2009, Penafiel of Liga de Honra signed him outright, but in January 2010 returned to Brazil for Joinville for 2010 Campeonato Catarinense and thus qualified 2010 Campeonato Brasileiro Série D as the best team in Santa Catarina which willing to play in national league.

On September 21, 2012, Santos, after shining in Série B, was, with his former Avaí partner Cléber Santana, presented at Flamengo. Without playing conditions, he must wait at least 15 days to debut for club.

Flamengo statistics
(Correct )

according to combined sources on the Flamengo official website and Flaestatística.

Honours
Copa Paulista de Futebol: 2007
Campeonato Paulista do Interior: 2008
Santa Catarina State League: 2012

References

External links
CBF Contract Record 

Profile at Portuguese Liga 

1987 births
Living people
People from São Bernardo do Campo
Brazilian footballers
Association football central defenders
Sport Club Corinthians Paulista players
Clube Atlético Juventus players
Grêmio Barueri Futebol players
Boavista F.C. players
Marília Atlético Clube players
F.C. Penafiel players
Joinville Esporte Clube players
Avaí FC players
CR Flamengo footballers
Esporte Clube Vitória players
América Futebol Clube (MG) players
Clube Atlético Bragantino players
Macaé Esporte Futebol Clube players
Mogi Mirim Esporte Clube players
Democrata Futebol Clube players
Associação Atlética de Altos players
Associação Olímpica de Itabaiana players
Campeonato Brasileiro Série A players
Campeonato Brasileiro Série B players
Liga Portugal 2 players
Brazilian expatriate footballers
Brazilian expatriate sportspeople in Portugal
Expatriate footballers in Portugal
Footballers from São Paulo (state)